Betty Ann Kennedy (March 13, 1930 – October 30, 2016) was an American bridge player from Shreveport, Louisiana. She won five world championships, including four from 1974 to 1984 in partnership with Carol Sanders of Tennessee and the 2003 Venice Cup. Analyst Eric Kokish wrote concerning the 2003 final match that "Kennedy was a standout, doing virtually nothing wrong." 

She studied bridge on her doctor's recommendation when she suffered from encephalitis and consequent depression. Sanders and Kennedy were known as "the Southern Belles" or simply "The Belles". They compiled 10 NABC wins and 8 runners-up together.

In 1993 Kennedy became the second woman to receive the Louisiana Hall of Fame Award. She was inducted into the ACBL Hall of Fame in 2005. She received the ACBL's annual sportsmanship award in 2011.

Kennedy and her husband Jack, another bridge player, had four children. She died in Shreveport on October 30, 2016, at the age of 86 after a fall.

Bridge accomplishments

Honors

 Louisiana Hall of Fame, 1993
 ACBL Hall of Fame, 2005
 Sidney Lazard Jr. Sportsmanship Award, 2011

Wins

 Venice Cup, 2003
 North American Bridge Championships (15)
 Whitehead Women's Pairs (1) 1993 
 Smith Life Master Women's Pairs (2) 1990, 2008 
 Machlin Women's Swiss Teams (3) 1983, 1995, 2002 
 Wagar Women's Knockout Teams (7) 1978, 1980, 1983, 1987, 2000, 2001, 2009 
 Sternberg Women's Board-a-Match Teams (2) 1992, 1995

Runners-up

 North American Bridge Championships
 Whitehead Women's Pairs (2) 1990, 1992 
 Smith Life Master Women's Pairs (2) 1971, 1981 
 Machlin Women's Swiss Teams (2) 1985, 2000 
 Wagar Women's Knockout Teams (6) 1982, 1992, 2002, 2005, 2006, 2010 
 Sternberg Women's Board-a-Match Teams (2) 1986, 1991

References

External links
  – with video interview
 
 Women Stars at the World Bridge Federation – with biographies (Kennedy)
 Kennedy is one of eight featured "Past Great Champions".

1930 births
2016 deaths
American contract bridge players
Venice Cup players
People from Shreveport, Louisiana
Deaths from falls
Place of birth missing